The women's 800 metres at the 1962 European Athletics Championships was held in Belgrade, then Yugoslavia, at JNA Stadium on 15 and 16 September 1962.

Medalists

Results

Final
16 September

Heats
15 September

Heat 1

Heat 2

Heat 3

Participation
According to an unofficial count, 19 athletes from 11 countries participated in the event.

 (2)
 (2)
 (1)
 (1)
 (2)
 (1)
 (2)
 (3)
 (3)
 (1)
 (1)

References

800 metres
800 metres at the European Athletics Championships
Euro